Anisocanthon is a genus of Scarabaeidae or scarab beetles in the superfamily Scarabaeoidea.

Species
 Anisocanthon pygmaeus (Gillet, 1911)
 Anisocanthon sericinus (Harold, 1868)
 Anisocanthon strandi (Balthasar, 1939)
 Anisocanthon villosus (Harold, 1868)

References

Scarabaeidae genera
Deltochilini